The Kalorama Triangle Historic District is located in the Kalorama Heights neighborhood of Washington, D.C.  It was listed on the National Register of Historic Places in 2004.  It has been listed on the District of Columbia Inventory of Historic Sites since 1986. 
The district is home to roughly 350 contributing properties.

Contributing properties
 Fuller House

See also
 Kalorama, Washington, D.C.—Kalorama Triangle neighborhood history and boundaries

References

External links

 NPS: Kalorama Triangle Historic District webpage
 District of Columbia Historic Preservation Office: Kalorama Triangle Historic District Brochure
 D.C. Historic Preservation Office: Kalorama Triangle Historic District Map

Historic districts on the National Register of Historic Places in Washington, D.C.
Kalorama (Washington, D.C.)